The Ditty Bops is the self-titled debut album by the folk/swing band The Ditty Bops. Released on Warner Bros. Records in 2004, it features a cover of the old standard "Sister Kate."

Five tracks from this album were featured on the television show Grey's Anatomy ("Walk Or Ride", "Wishful Thinking", "Sister Kate", "There's a Girl" and "Wake Up").

Track listing
 "Walk Or Ride" – 3:11
 "Wishful Thinking" – 2:39
 "Ooh La La" – 3:53
 "Sister Kate" – 2:25
 "Breeze Black Night" – 2:58
 "Gentle Sheep" – 3:24
 "Pale Yellow" – 2:46
 "Four Left Feet" – 2:48
 "There's A Girl" – 3:02
 "Unfortunate Few" – 4:02
 "Short Stacks" – 2:36
 "Wake Up" – 2:25

References

The Ditty Bops albums
2004 albums
Albums produced by Mitchell Froom